was one of 23 escort destroyers of the Tachibana sub-class of the  built for the Imperial Japanese Navy during the final stages of World War II. The ship was used to repatriate Japanese personnel after the war until 1947. Mid-year the destroyer was turned over to the Soviet Union and was commissioned that same year. She was renamed Vyrazitelny ( (Expressive)) later that year. When the ship was converted into a target ship in 1949, she was renamed TsL-26. The vessel was ordered to be scrapped a decade later.

Design and description
The Tachibana sub-class was a simplified version of the preceding  to make them even more suited for mass production. The ships had two Kampon geared steam turbines, each driving one propeller shaft, using steam provided by two Kampon water-tube boilers.

The main armament of the Tachibana sub-class consisted of three Type 89  dual-purpose guns in one twin-gun mount aft and one single mount forward of the superstructure. The single mount was partially protected against spray by a gun shield. The accuracy of the Type 89 guns was severely reduced against aircraft because no high-angle gunnery director was fitted. They carried a total of 25 Type 96  anti-aircraft guns in 4 triple and 13 single mounts. The Tachibanas were equipped with Type 13 early-warning and Type 22 surface-search radars. The ships were also armed with a single rotating quadruple mount amidships for  torpedoes. They could deliver their 60 depth charges via two stern rails and two throwers.

Construction and service

Hatsuzakura (Early-blooming Cherry) was ordered in Fiscal Year 1943 under the Modified 5th Naval Armaments Supplement Program as part of the Matsu class, but the design was simplified to facilitate production and the ship was one of those built to the modified design. She was laid down on 12 April 1944 by Yokosuka Naval Arsenal, launched on 10 February 1945 and completed on 28 May. Hatsuzakura was assigned that day to Destroyer Squadron 11 under the Combined Fleet for working up; on 15 July she was transferred to the Yokosuka Naval District. On 27 August the ship ferried Japanese emissaries and local pilots to the entrance to Tokyo Bay to meet the American battleship . The ship was turned over to Allied forces at Yokosuka at the time of the surrender of Japan on 2 September and was stricken from the navy list on 15 September. The destroyer was disarmed and used to repatriate Japanese personnel in 1945–1947. Hatsuzakura was turned over to the Soviet Union on 29 July of the latter year.

The ship was commissioned that same day and assigned to the Fifth Fleet. Hatsuzakura was renamed Vyrazitelny on 2 October and was placed in reserve on 14 February 1949. She was disarmed, converted into a target ship and renamed TsL-26 on 17 June. The ship was transferred to the Pacific Fleet on 23 April 1953. She was stricken from the navy list on 11 March 1958 and ordered to be scrapped on 19 February 1959.

Notes

Bibliography

 
 

Tachibana-class destroyers
Ships built by Yokosuka Naval Arsenal
1945 ships
World War II destroyers of Japan
Destroyers of the Soviet Navy